Deception: Oo Pel Dan Myin, is a 2018 Burmese drama film starring Zenn Kyi, Thet Mon Myint, Kaew Korravee and Aung Myint Myat. The film produced by Central Base Film Production premiered in Myanmar on January 19, 2018.

Synopsis
Min Htet and Zin Mar was a newlywed couple.  Zin Mar had a heart condition and was in poor health. Min Htet ran an art gallery and sold antiques.  It was a normal family life.  One day, a couple moved into their yard. The girl is a lovely Thai girl. When Min Htet saw the unresolved relationship between this Thai girl and a man who seems to be her husband and felt sorry for the Thai girl....

Cast

References

External links

2018 films
2010s Burmese-language films
Burmese drama films
Films shot in Myanmar
2018 drama films